Territorial Assembly elections were held in Mauritania on 31 March 1957. The result was a victory for the Mauritanian Progressive Union, which won 33 of the 34 seats. The other seat was won by an independent candidate in the Baie du Levrier constituency.

Results

References

Elections in Mauritania
Mauritania
Territorial Assembly election
Mauritanian Territorial Assembly election